Robert Wingfield was a sixteenth century English landowner and puritan activist who served as member of parliament (MP) for Suffolk. He was the first son of Anthony Wingfield, who had also been MP for the constituency.
He married first Cicely, daughter of Thomas Wentworth, 1st Baron Wentworth, and was father of Anthony Wingfield (1554-1605), MP for Orford; and secondly Bridget, daughter of Sir John Spring of Cockfield and Hitcham, Suffolk, and widow of Thomas Fleetwood of The Vache, Buckinghamshire, Master of the Mint.

References

1596 deaths
Year of birth missing
16th-century English landowners
Members of the Parliament of England for constituencies in Suffolk
English MPs 1563–1567
English MPs 1572–1583
High Sheriffs of Norfolk
High Sheriffs of Suffolk